"Fate" is the title song for Finnish-Chinese movie Jadesoturi (Jade Warrior). The song is by the rock band Bleak, featuring Swedish singer Ana Johnsson dueting with Caleb (lead singer of Bleak) on vocals, and highly acclaimed Finnish accordionist Kimmo Pohjonen, who also composed the score for the film.
"Fate" will be available on the Jade Warrior soundtrack that was released on October 11 in Finland. The film premiered on October 13 in Finland and debuted at #2, right after The Devil Wears Prada. A music video has also been shot for the song, watch it .

Fate was one of the most played songs on the Finnish radios in 2006.
Fate was also made available on Ana Johnsson's single Break Through Time and on Bleak's single Silvertigo.

Awards

"Fate" song received the award for 'Best Nordic Song' at the NRJ Radio Awards in 2007.

Ana Johnsson songs
2006 singles